Brocato's Sandwich Shop is a historic eatery in Tampa, Florida. It opened in 1948 and is best known for its Cuban sandwich. Brocato's is "widely regarded as one of Tampa's landmark eateries."

References

External links
Brocato's Sandwich Shop website

1948 establishments in Florida
Companies based in Tampa, Florida
Cuban-American culture in Tampa, Florida
Restaurants in Tampa, Florida
Restaurants established in 1948